Dobrava is a Slovene place name that may refer to:

Blejska Dobrava, a village in the Municipality of Jesenice, northwestern Slovenia
Cerkljanska Dobrava, a village in the Municipality of Cerklje na Gorenjskem, northwestern Slovenia
Dobrava, Izola, a village in the Municipality of Izola, Slovenia, southwestern Slovenia
Dobrava, Križevci, a village in the Municipality of Križevci, Slovenia, northeastern Slovenia
Dobrava, Ormož, a village in the Municipality of Ormož, northeastern Slovenia
Dobrava, Radeče, a village in the Municipality of Radeče, southeastern Slovenia
Dobrava, Radlje ob Dravi, a village in the Municipality of Radlje ob Dravi, northeastern Slovenia
Dobrava, Trebnje, a village in the Municipality of Trebnje, southeastern Slovenia
Dobrava ob Krki, a village in the Municipality of Krško, southeastern Slovenia
Dobrava pod Rako, a village in the Municipality of Krško, southeastern Slovenia
Dobrava pri Konjicah, a village in the Municipality of Slovenske Konjice, northeastern Slovenia
Dobrava pri Kostanjevici, a village in the Municipality of Kostanjevica na Krki, southeastern Slovenia
Dobrava pri Stični, a village in the Municipality of Ivančna Gorica, southeastern Slovenia
Dobrava pri Škocjanu, a village in the Municipality of Škocjan, southeastern Slovenia
Dolenja Dobrava, Gorenja Vas–Poljane, a village in the Municipality of Gorenja Vas–Poljane
Dolenja Dobrava, Trebnje, a village in the Municipality of Trebnje, southeastern Slovenia
Gorenja Dobrava, Gorenja Vas–Poljane, a village in the Municipality of Gorenja Vas–Poljane
Gorenja Dobrava, Trebnje, a village in the Municipality of Trebnje, southeastern Slovenia
Komendska Dobrava, a village in the Municipality of Komenda
Mala Dobrava, a village in the Municipality of Ivančna Gorica, southeastern Slovenia
Mislinjska Dobrava, a village in the Municipality of Slovenj Gradec, northeastern Slovenia
Spodnja Dobrava, Moravče, a village in the Municipality of Moravče, central Slovenia
Spodnja Dobrava, Radovljica, a village in the Municipality of Radovljica, northwestern Slovenia
Srednja Dobrava, a village in the Municipality of Radovljica, northwestern Slovenia
Velika Dobrava, a village in the Municipality of Ivančna Gorica, southeastern Slovenia
Zgornja Dobrava, Moravče, a village in the Municipality of Moravče, central Slovenia
Zgornja Dobrava, Radovljica, a village in the Municipality of Radovljica, northwestern Slovenia

See also
 
 Dobrava (toponym)